Martin Skotnický (born 24 August 1947) is a Slovak ice dancing coach and former competitor for Czechoslovakia. With his sister, Diana Skotnická, he is the 1970 Winter Universiade champion and a five-time Czechoslovak national champion (1970–74). They placed sixth at the 1973 European Championships.

Personal life 
Skotnický was born on 24 August 1947. He has Slovak and French citizenship. He is the brother of Diana Skotnická. He is married to Bruni Skotnicky, who competed in pair skating for Germany as Brunhilde Baßler.

Career

Competitive 
Skotnický switched from single skating to ice dancing after a fracture. He teamed up with his sister, Diana Skotnická. Their coaches included Ivan Mauer, Hilda Múdra, and Míla Nováková. The siblings took silver at the 1968 Winter Universiade in Innsbruck, Austria.

In the 1969–1970 season, Skotnická/Skotnický won the first of their five consecutive national titles and placed 11th at the World Championships in Ljubljana, Yugoslavia. They concluded their season with gold at the 1970 Winter Universiade in Rovaniemi, Finland.

Skotnická/Skotnický competed at nine ISU Championships. Their best continental result, sixth, came at the 1973 European Championships in Cologne, West Germany. A few weeks later, they would achieve their career-best world result, finishing eighth at the 1973 World Championships in Bratislava, Czechoslovakia. The two retired from competition in 1974.

Post-competitive 
In 1975, Skotnický became director of a figure skating rink in Metz, France. In the early 1980s, he was an assistant coach for British ice dancers Jayne Torvill / Christopher Dean. He now coaches in Oberstdorf, Germany. He has worked with:
 Isabelle Duchesnay / Paul Duchesnay
 Susanna Rahkamo / Petri Kokko
 Nelli Zhiganshina / Alexander Gazsi
 Kati Winkler / René Lohse
 Christina Beier / William Beier
 Petra Born / Rainer Schönborn
 Jennifer Goolsbee / Hendryk Schamberger
 Claudia Leistner
 Tanja Kolbe / Stefano Caruso

Results 
(with Diana Skotnická)

References 

Living people
Czechoslovak male ice dancers
Slovak figure skating coaches
Figure skaters from Bratislava
Universiade medalists in figure skating
1947 births
Slovak male ice dancers
Universiade gold medalists for Czechoslovakia
Competitors at the 1968 Winter Universiade
Competitors at the 1970 Winter Universiade